Raorchestes charius (common names: Karnataka bubble-nest frog, Seshachar's bush frog, Chari's bush frog) is a species of frog in the family Rhacophoridae. It is endemic to the Western Ghats, India. It is an arboreal species living in tropical moist evergreen forests in the Karnataka state. It is threatened by habitat loss caused by the conversion of native forests into cultivated areas.

References

External links

charius
Frogs of India
Endemic fauna of the Western Ghats
Taxa named by C. R. Narayan Rao
Taxonomy articles created by Polbot
Amphibians described in 1937